Samuel J. Hoffman (July 23, 1903 in New York City – December 6, 1967 in Los Angeles) was a notable thereminist.

At age 14, began playing the violin professionally in New York City.  Under the stage name Hal Hope, he led nightclub and society bands.  By 1936, he had taken up the theremin and begun featuring it in publicity for his engagements.

In 1941, Hoffman moved to Los Angeles, where he established a medical practice and had little time for musical activity.  But as the only theremin player in Local 47 of the Musicians Union, he got the call in 1945 when composer Miklos Rozsa decided he wanted to use a theremin in the score to Spellbound.  Hoffman began performing under his real name; he was customarily referred to as "Doctor" because he was also a podiatrist.  In the wake of the film's success, he was asked to play on many more soundtracks; for instance, The Day the Earth Stood Still (1951).  He was in demand for horror movie and sci fi soundtracks through the end of the 1950s.

In the late 1940s, he recorded three 10” studio albums with bandleaders Les Baxter and Billy May.  These were forerunners to exotica; they also influenced Sun Ra, who recorded a composition from Perfume Set to Music on his first LP, Jazz by Sun Ra.  One of Hoffman's last recordings, made in 1967, was Safe as Milk by Captain Beefheart and his Magic Band, where he appeared on two tracks.

Death
Hoffman died of a heart attack on December 6, 1967.

Discography
Music Out of the Moon (1947)
Perfume Set to Music (1948)
Music for Peace of Mind (1949)

These albums are compiled and remastered in Waves in the Ether: The Magical World of the Theremin (2004).

Filmography
Spellbound (1945)
The Lost Weekend (1945)
The Spiral Staircase (1945)
The Red House (1947)
The Pretender (1947)
Road to Rio (1947)
Raw Deal (1948)
Let's Live a Little (1948)
Impact (1949)
She Shoulda Said No! (1949)
Oriental Evil (1950)
Rocketship X-M (1950)
Fancy Pants (1950)
Let's Dance (1950)
The Thing from Another World (1951)
The Day the Earth Stood Still (1951)
Phantom from Space (1953)
It Came from Outer Space (1953)
The 5,000 Fingers of Dr. T. (1953)
Project Moon Base (1953)
The Mad Magician (1954)
Day the World Ended (1955)
Please Murder Me (1956)
The Ten Commandments (1956)
Our Mr. Sun (1956)
Voodoo Island (1957)
The Delicate Delinquent (1957)
Earth vs. the Spider (1958)
Billy the Kid versus Dracula (1966)

References

External links
 
 Dr Samuel Hoffman Biography

Theremin players
American podiatrists
1903 births
1967 deaths
20th-century American musicians
Songwriters from New York (state)